Yeni-Kale (also spelled as Yenikale and Eni-Kale and Yeni-Kaleh or Yéni-Kaleb) is a fortress on the shore of Kerch Strait in the city of Kerch.

History
Yeni-Kale was built by Ottoman Turks in 1699–1706 on the Kerch peninsula that belonged to the Crimean Khanate. The name Yenikale means New Castle in Turkish (yeni - new, kale - castle). The fortress was built under the guidance of Goloppo, who was an Italian convert to Islam. Several French engineers also took part in the construction.

Yeni-Kale was armed with powerful cannons and took an important strategical place on the coast of Kerch Strait. The fortress occupied area of 25,000 m² and had two powder-magazines, arsenal, water reservoir, living houses, bath-house and mosque. About 800 Turkish and 300 Crimean Tatar soldiers were garrisoned in Yeni-Kale. The weak spot of the fortress was a lack of drinking water in the area, so an underground water-pipe was made to bring water from a source located several kilometres away from the fortress. Yeni-Kale also served as a residence of the pasha.

During the Russo-Turkish War of 1768–1774 the Russian Army invaded Crimea in the summer of 1771. Though reinforcements from the Ottoman Empire had arrived beforehand, the Turks decided to abandon Yeni-Kale. Russian units under command of general Nikolay Borzov entered the fortress on 21 June 1771. Abaza Muhammad Pasha who was a commandant of Yeni-Kale fled to Sinop and the sultan sentenced him to death for the number of military failures.

After the Treaty of Küçük Kaynarca in 1774, Kerch and the fortress of Yeni-Kale were ceded to Russia. The fortress became a part of the Kerch-Yenikale city municipality of the Taurida Governorate.

In the 19th century the fortress was used by Russians as a military hospital. Since the 1880s Yeni-Kale was completely deserted.

Today ruins of Yeni-Kale are often visited by tourists. The neighboring district of Kerch also is named Yeni-Kale.

Gallery

References

External links

 Yenikale Fortress, Castles in Ukraine

Buildings and structures in Kerch
Ottoman fortifications
Crimean Khanate
Castles in Ukraine
Government buildings completed in 1706
Infrastructure completed in 1706
Tourist attractions in Crimea
Forts in Ukraine
1706 establishments in the Ottoman Empire
1706 establishments in Ukraine
Cultural heritage monuments of federal significance in Crimea